Clément Rigaud (born 26 September 1984 in Paris) is a French football player who currently plays as a goalkeeper. He serves as captain of the club and formerly has stints with professional clubs Guingamp, Stade Reims, and Louhans-Cuiseaux, though the latter club is currently no longer professional. Rigaud failed to make an appearance with Guingamp or Louhans-Cuiseaux, but did appear in two Coupe de France matches, while playing with Reims. Rigaud is in his second stint with Gap having spent two seasons with the club through 2004–2006.

References

External links
 

1984 births
Living people
French footballers
Association football goalkeepers
Footballers from Paris
Championnat National players
Gap HAFC players
En Avant Guingamp players
Stade de Reims players
US Albi players
Louhans-Cuiseaux FC players
ÉFC Fréjus Saint-Raphaël players
Chambéry SF players